Zander Tyler (born February 22, 1982), better known under his stage name Jack Parow, is a South African rapper who has collaborated with other South African artists such as Die Heuwels Fantasties, Die Antwoord and Francois Van Coke.

Career
Parow wanted to be a rapper since he was in primary school. He used to rap with friend Keagan Cloete aka cutie cloete, citing Snoop Dogg's Doggystyle as an initial inspiration as well as the likes of T-Pain. Although he started rapping in English, he soon decided that he preferred Afrikaans.

His first hit came with the single Cooler as Ekke and jeffalingaling, which was promoted by friends in Die Heuwels Fantasties. He collaborated with them on their song Die Vraagstuk. He has since released four studio albums and toured around the world.

In 2015, Parow released a biography, Die Ou Met die Snor by die Bar, authored by local artist Theunis Engelbrecht.

In 2016, Parow and his friend Hardus van Deventer shot a nine episode TV series titled Dis Hoe Ons Rol, which aired from July to August 2016 on the Kyknet premium TV channel. Filming took place as two legs over 30 days, during which Parow performed in each of South Africa's nine provinces at least once.

In January 2017, Parow launched his own brandy product known as Parow Brandy.

He is currently managed by Fokofpolisiekar and Van Coke Kartel member, Wynand Myburgh.

Personal life
Parow has a daughter, Ruby Tyler, born in 2012. Ruby was the inspiration for Parow's 2014 song Dis Befok, and video footage for the 2016 remix of the song was shot by her via a chest-mounted camera.

Discography
Jack Parow's first release was the Cooler as ekke EP in December 2009. It was released as a limited edition of 600 ice-creamcone-shaped USB flash drives and featured 10 songs and six music videos.

Studio albums

EPs

References

External links
 

1982 births
Living people
Afrikaner people
Alternative hip hop musicians
South African rappers
Musicians from Cape Town